Archie Clinton Dunsmoor (March 6, 1923 – June 9, 2007) was an American football coach.  He served as the head football coach at Eastern Oregon University in La Grande, Oregon from 1955 to 1967, compiling a record of 29–78–4.

Head coaching record

College

References

External links
 

1923 births
2007 deaths
Eastern Oregon Mountaineers football coaches
High school football coaches in Oregon
Sportspeople from Portland, Oregon
Players of American football from Portland, Oregon